Sue James is an American accountant and since January 2010 is a member of the board of directors at Yahoo!. She was a Partner of Ernst & Young from 1987 until she retired in 2006.

She is a graduate of Hunter College and San Jose State University.

References

Year of birth missing (living people)
Living people
Hunter College alumni
San Jose State University alumni
American accountants
Women accountants
American women business executives
American corporate directors
Directors of Yahoo!
Women in finance
Women corporate directors
21st-century American businesspeople
21st-century American businesswomen